= Dawn Hill, Arkansas =

Unincorporated community in Arkansas, US

Coordinates: 36°13′58″N 94°30′49″W

Dawn Hill is an unincorporated community in Benton County, Arkansas, United States.
